Steve High is an American former women's basketball coach. Prior to retirement, High served as the head coach for the Dodge City Conquistadors women's basketball program from 2007 to 2011, and before that was the head coach at Pittsburg State University from 1989 to 2007.

Career

Early career 
High, a native of Keokuk, Iowa, began his career in athletics as a head basketball school at the high school level in Marion, Iowa, where he led the Linn-Mar High School girls program to a  record and the school's first ever state championship. He served from 1981 to 1985. Following his successful high school career, High served as an assistant coach for the Nebraska Cornhuskers women's basketball program from 1985 to 1989.

Pittsburg State University 
On April 24, 1989, High was named head coach for Pittsburg State University's women's basketball program, meaning he would help the program transition from the National Association of Intercollegiate Athletics to the NCAA Division II. During his 18 years as head coach, High led Pittsburg State to two Mid-America Intercollegiate Athletics Association regular season championships – 1992 and 1996 – and led the program to five NCAA Tournament postseason appearances in 1992, 1992, 1995, 1997, and 1998.

Dodge City Community College 
Despite announcing his retirement effective the end of the 2006–07 season, High was hired as the Dodge City Community College (DC3) women's basketball head coach.

Head coach record

References

Living people
American women's basketball coaches
Basketball coaches from Iowa
Pittsburg State Gorillas women's basketball coaches
Dodge City Conquistadors women's basketball coaches
People from Lee County, Iowa
Year of birth missing (living people)